Sollas Glacier is a glacier between Marr and Hughes Glaciers, flowing from the Kukri Hills toward the east end of Lake Bonney in Taylor Valley, Victoria Land. Charted and named by the British Antarctic Expedition under Scott, 1910–13, for William J. Sollas, professor of geology at Oxford.

Glaciers of Victoria Land
McMurdo Dry Valleys